Koonung Province was an electorate of the Victorian Legislative Council. It existed as a two-member electorate from 1992 to 2006, with members serving alternating eight-year terms. It replaced the abolished Boronia Province. It was a safe seat for the Liberal Party for most of its history, but was won by Labor Party candidate Helen Buckingham in Labor's landslide victory at the 2002 state election. The electorate was abolished from the 2006 state election in the wake of the Bracks Labor government's reform of the Legislative Council.

It was located in the outer east of Melbourne. In 2002, when it was last contested, it covered an area of 134 km2 and included the suburbs of Blackburn, Boronia, Ferntree Gully, Mitcham, Nunawading, Rowville, Scoresby, Vermont and Wheelers Hill.

Members for Koonung Province

Election results

References

Former electoral provinces of Victoria (Australia)
1992 establishments in Australia
2006 disestablishments in Australia